Kenneth Richard Lockett (born August 30, 1947) is a Canadian retired professional ice hockey goaltender who played for the Vancouver Canucks of the National Hockey League (NHL) and the San Diego Mariners of the World Hockey Association (WHA).

Playing career
Lockett played university hockey in Canada with the Guelph Gryphons of the CIAU for one season before turning pro with the Baltimore Clippers of the American Hockey League (AHL) in 1972–73.  After two seasons in the AHL, Lockett joined the Vancouver Canucks of the National Hockey League (NHL) where he played backup to Gary Smith.  In his first year with the Canucks, he recorded 2 consecutive shutouts as part of a franchise record setting 184:20 minute shutout streak in April 1975.  The mark stood as a Canucks record for 32 years until 2007 when Roberto Luongo went 210:34 minutes. Following his second season with the Canucks, he left to join the NHL-rival-league World Hockey Association (WHA) with the San Diego Mariners.

Career statistics

Regular season and playoffs

References

External links

1947 births
Living people
Baltimore Clippers players
Canadian ice hockey goaltenders
Fort Wayne Komets players
Ice hockey people from Toronto
San Diego Mariners players
Undrafted National Hockey League players
University of Guelph alumni
Vancouver Canucks players